The School of Artillery is an army artillery training establishment in several Commonwealth armies.

School of Artillery (Australia)
 School of Artillery (Indian Army) - see Regiment of Artillery (India)
School of Artillery (New Zealand) 
School of Artillery (Pakistan)
School of Artillery (Sri Lanka)
School of Artillery (South Africa)

See also
Royal School of Artillery

Artillery units and formations
Army training units and formations